Erich Engels (23 May 1889 – 25 April 1971) was a German screenwriter, producer and film director. He should not be confused with another contemporary German director Erich Engel.

Selected filmography
 Dear Homeland (1929)
 Rooms to Let (1930)
 The Murderer Dimitri Karamazov (1931)
 Secret of the Blue Room (1932)
 At Your Orders, Sergeant (1932)
 Crime Reporter Holm (1932)
 The Roberts Case (1933)
 Peter, Paul and Nanette (1935)
 Fruit in the Neighbour's Garden (1935)
 Thunder, Lightning and Sunshine (1936)
 The Grey Lady (1937)
 In the Name of the People (1939)
 Central Rio (1939)
 Doctor Crippen (1942)
 The Golden Spider (1943)
 Friday the Thirteenth (1949)
 The Murder Trial of Doctor Jordan (1949)
 The Lady in Black (1951)
 The Night Without Morals (1953)
 Three Birch Trees on the Heath (1956)
 Fruit in the Neighbour's Garden (1956)
 Widower with Five Daughters (1957)
 Doctor Crippen Lives (1958)
 Father, Mother and Nine Children (1958)
 Of Course, the Motorists (1959)

References

Bibliography
 Bock, Hans-Michael & Bergfelder, Tim. The Concise CineGraph. Encyclopedia of German Cinema. Berghahn Books, 2009.

External links

1889 births
1971 deaths
Film people from North Rhine-Westphalia
People from Remscheid